The Plympton Formation is a geologic formation in Utah. It preserves fossils dating back to the Permian period.

See also

 List of fossiliferous stratigraphic units in Utah
 Paleontology in Utah

References
 

Permian geology of Nevada
Permian geology of Utah